EUF may refer to:

 Egypt Urban Forum, an international urbanization forum held in Cairo, Egypt
 Ethiopian Unity Front, a successor of the Kefagn Patriotic Front
 European Ultimate Federation, the governing body for the sport of ultimate frisbee in Europe
 European Underwater Federation, a scuba diving training federation
 Weedon Field (IATA airport code: EUF, ICAO airport code: KEUF), an airport in Barbour County, Alabama, United States
 Existential unforgeability; see digital signature forgery

See also

 
 
 
 Oeuf (disambiguation)
 Ouf (disambiguation)